Jemasa, Jammasa or Al Jammasa a Euphrates Arab tribal Federation that was centered around the Lower Khabur region. The 17th century Cammasa/Jemasa district in Eyalet of Raqqa was named after the tribe then dominant at that region.

Kurdish Chiefdom
In the 16th century the Emirate of Cammasa was under the rule of a Kurdish prince, until 1628 when it was transferred to direct Ottoman rule from Urfa then the new capital of the new Eyalet of Raqqa

See also
Diyar Mudar
Kurdish chiefdoms

References

Khabur (Euphrates)
Euphrates
Upper Mesopotamia
Bedouin groups